Horatio L. Birdsall (July 16, 1833 – November 29, 1891) was a sergeant who served the Union Army during the American Civil War. He was part of Company B in the 3rd Regiment Iowa Volunteer Cavalry. Birdsall was awarded a Medal of Honor.

Early life
Birdsall was born in Monroe County, New York.

Service
Birdsall, at the time of the Civil War's breakout, was an inhabitant of Iowa. He enlisted in the 3rd Iowa Cavalry at Keokuk.
When General James H. Wilson moved on Columbus, Georgia, the 3rd Regiment accompanied him. In the Battle of Columbus, Birdsall and his regiment attacked a series of Confederate entrenchments that protected a bridge over the Chattahoochee River. The Regiment captured the entrenchments and bridge; Birdsall captured the Confederate flag-bearer and the flag. For the capture of the flagbearer, Birdsall won the Medal of Honor.

During the war, Birdsall lost a part of his right thumb and was wounded in the head.

Later life and death
Birdsall moved to Lawrence, Kansas after the war ended. He died November 29, 1891, and was buried at Arlington National Cemetery, Arlington, Virginia.

See also

 List of Medal of Honor recipients

References

External links
 
 

1833 births
1891 deaths
People from Monroe County, New York
People of Iowa in the American Civil War
People from Lawrence, Kansas
Union Army soldiers
United States Army Medal of Honor recipients
Burials at Arlington National Cemetery
American Civil War recipients of the Medal of Honor